Meredith Ann Pierce (born July 5, 1958, in Seattle, Washington) is a fantasy writer and librarian.  Her books deal in fantasy worlds with mythic settings and frequently feature young women who first wish only to love and be loved, yet who must face hazard and danger to save their way of life, their world, and so on, usually without being respected for their efforts until the end of the story.

Career
Her first book started a trilogy often referred to as The Darkangel Trilogy.  Published in 1982, The Darkangel featured a story that Pierce claims came to her all at once while she read the account of a dream recounted to Carl Jung, one of the fathers of psychiatry.  It was followed in 1984 by A Gathering of Gargoyles, and concluded in 1989 with The Pearl of the Soul of the World.  These books told the story of a slave girl who finds herself trying to kill a darkangel to avenge his kidnapping of her mistress.  She then finds herself forced to care for the thirteen wraiths who were once his beautiful and unwilling brides, and must also resist the attractions of the vampyre.  As she makes her way through the books, she finds more and more responsibility laid on her slender shoulders, with few friends and much danger as well.

Pierce's second and more popular trilogy, The Firebringer Trilogy, involved a tribe of unicorns on a different fantasy world.  It started with Birth of the Firebringer in 1985, continued in Dark Moon, published in 1992, and ended with The Son of Summer Stars in 1996.  Jan, the hero of the trilogy, is part messiah, part King Arthur-figure.  All three books were re-printed by Firebird Books in 2003.

Pierce has written other fantasy novels, which are frequently published as either Young Adult Fiction or as general Fantasy, and sometimes in each category.  Her most recent book, Waters Luminous and Deep, is a book of short stories marketed for adults.

Books

The Darkangel Trilogy
1982 The Darkangel
Won International Reading Association Children's Book Award
Won California Young Reader Medal
1985 A Gathering of Gargoyles
1990 The Pearl of the Soul of the World

The Firebringer Trilogy
1985 Birth of the Firebringer
1992 Dark Moon
1996 The Son of Summer Stars

Other books
1985 The Woman Who Loved Reindeer
1988 Where the Wild Geese Go - a picture book
2001 Treasure at the Heart of the Tanglewood
2004 Waters Luminous and Deep - a book of short fiction

External links

 , "Moon and Unicorn"
Interview at Sequential Tart
 
 

1958 births
Living people
American children's writers
American fantasy writers
American women short story writers
American women novelists
Writers from Seattle
20th-century American novelists
21st-century American novelists
American women children's writers
Women science fiction and fantasy writers
20th-century American women writers
21st-century American women writers
20th-century American short story writers
21st-century American short story writers
Novelists from Washington (state)